Obliquaria reflexa, common name the threehorn wartyback or three-horn wartyback, is a species of freshwater mussel, an aquatic bivalve mollusk in the family Unionidae, the river mussels.

References

Unionidae
Bivalves described in 1820
Taxa named by Constantine Samuel Rafinesque